Gus Kartes (born October 19, 1981), also known by his Greek name Kostas Karterouliotis, is an American retired soccer player who played as a striker.

Kartes initially became notable in 1996 when, at the age of 15, he signed a five year, $2 million contract with Greek club Olympiacos, becoming the youngest player to ever sign a first-division contract in Greece. Kartes did not fulfill Olympiakos's hopes, however, garnering little first team playing time, and eventually bought out his contract with a year remaining in order to return to America and play in Major League Soccer. Upon returning to the United States, the Colorado Rapids acquired Kartes in a lottery, but traded him to his hometown Tampa Bay Mutiny in exchange for draft picks. Kartes played the 2001 season for the Mutiny, but was largely unimpressive, registering no points in 516 minutes.  After the Mutiny were contracted at the end of the 2001 season, Kartes went undrafted in the allocation and dispersal drafts.

Following this, Kartes returned to Greece to play for Kalamata FC of the Greek second division. He returned to the United States in 2004 to sign with the Chicago Storm of the Major Indoor Soccer League. The Storm was coached by fellow Greek-American Frank Klopas.

References

1981 births
Living people
American people of Greek descent
American soccer players
Soccer players from Florida
People from Tarpon Springs, Florida
Association football forwards
Olympiacos F.C. players
Colorado Rapids players
Tampa Bay Mutiny players
Kalamata F.C. players
Chicago Storm (MISL) players
Super League Greece players
Major League Soccer players
Football League (Greece) players
Major Indoor Soccer League (2001–2008) players
United States men's youth international soccer players
American expatriate soccer players
Expatriate footballers in Greece
American expatriate sportspeople in Greece